João de Melo (1405-1486) was a Portuguese nobleman, alcaide-mor of Serpa, and copeiro-mor (Master of the Ceremonies) of Afonso V of Portugal.

Biography 

João was born in Portugal, the son of Martim Afonso de Melo and Briolanja de Sousa. His wife was Isabel da Silveira daughter of Nuno Martins da Silveira and Leonor Falcão.

References 

1405 births
1486 deaths
15th-century Portuguese people
Portuguese nobility
Portuguese Roman Catholics